This is a recap of the 1985 season for the Professional Bowlers Association (PBA) Tour.  It was the tour's 27th season, and consisted of 34 events. Mike Aulby had to defeat his brother-in-law, Steve Cook, in the final match to take the title in the Toledo Trust PBA National Championship. This was just one of six titles that Aulby won on the season, earning him 1985 PBA Player of the Year honors. Aulby also became the first PBA Player to ever cash more than $200,000 in season earnings, as he took home $201,200 on the year.

Marshall Holman became the first multiple winner of the modern-day BPAA U.S. Open. He had also won this event in 1981. Mark Williams made his first appearance in the Firestone Tournament of Champions, and took the title for his first major.

Tournament schedule

References

External links
1985 Season Schedule

Professional Bowlers Association seasons
1985 in bowling